The Peace River Bible Institute is a degree-granting college recognized by the province of Alberta. PBRI's Bachelor of Religious Education course was recognized after its establishment in the 1980s by the American Association of Bible Colleges. The Bible college is located in Sexsmith, Alberta, Canada.

History
The Peace River Bible Institute (PRBI) was founded in 1933 in Berwyn by Walter McNaughton, a graduate of the Prairie Bible Institute, who moved PRBI to its present location in Sexsmith two years later. PRBI's first director was Hattie Kirk, whose work was celebrated in an exhibition at the Grande Prairie Museum devoted to women's role in the history of the Peace region. The college's student numbers have risen rapidly since 1993, with the number of enrolments rising from 60 to 200 over the 10 years leading up to 2007.

Programs
Courses offered by PRBI range between one and four years in length, and cover religious education, church music, pastoral studies and mission work. The college's four-year Bachelor of Religious Education course in "Church Ministry and Community Service" can include fire fighting certification, with training provided through a partnership with the Sexsmith fire department. Some of the students who take these courses become pastors, but others seek employment in other professions.

Discipleship
PRBI is a self described discipleship-focused school. Its website states that "we are in the process of creating a transferable model of disciple-making to be observed and practiced within the student body." As part of their discipleship model PRBI encourages one-on-one discipleship relationships as well as facilitating mandatory discipleship groups called "Community Life Groups" which are led by various Community Life Leaders. Community Life Leaders are selected from upperclassmen who apply and are affirmed by the Campus Life Department for the following school year. Resident Leaders are also considered part of the discipleship model, as they oversee the spiritual and material needs of the various dormitories.

Recognition
A 2004 water balloon fight at PBRI involving 800 participants and 8,000 balloons was recognised by The Guinness Book of World Records as the largest yet conducted. The record was exceeded at Sint-Michielscollege Brasschaat in Belgium in April 2005.

Staff and faculty 
The current President of PRBI is Kim Cairns, who was promoted from academic dean to become the college's president in 2019. His forerunner was Waldie Neufeld. Kim Carins is also the Intercultural Ministries Program Advisor.

Academics:
Brad Cowie – Academic Dean, Registrar & Faculty
Jason Gayoway – Program Advisor & Faculty Field Education Advisor 
Scott Butler – Faculty & Librarian

Student Life:
Josh Rigby – Dean of Men
Anne Laursen – Dean of Women

For an extensive list of Team Members go to prbi.edu/PRBIteam

Historical list of staff and faculty

References

External links
PRBI's official website

Bible colleges
Christian educational institutions
Educational organizations based in Alberta
Educational institutions established in 1933
1933 establishments in Alberta